The Department of Agriculture, Aquaculture and Fisheries is an executive agency of the Government of New Brunswick. It is in charge of the development and support of food production and economic development through such sectors of the economy.

History 
The department was established on March 23, 2000 when Premier Bernard Lord restructured the New Brunswick Cabinet. It was a merger of the former departments of Agriculture and Rural Development and Fisheries & Aquaculture first under the name of the Department of Food Development and later under the name Department of Agriculture, Fisheries and Aquaculture. The creation of this department was very controversial and marked by protests by both farmers and fishers, though primarily farmers, who felt that the new department would not be specialized to adequately address their issues.

When Shawn Graham became Premier on October 3, 2006, he appointed a Minister of Agriculture and Aquaculture and a Minister of Fisheries. On March 2, 2007, a bill disbanding this department and creating a Department of Agriculture and Aquaculture and a Department of Fisheries received royal assent, the bill was retroactive to October 3, 2006. When Graham left office, Alward re-merged the departments under the new name Agriculture, Aquaculture and Fisheries.

Ministers

References

External links
Department of Agriculture, Fisheries and Aquaculture

Agriculture, Aquaculture and Fisheries
Agriculture in Canada
New Brunswick
New Brunswick
Ministries established in 2000